Junior Langi (born 2 August 1981) is a former professional rugby league footballer who played in the 2000s for St George, Melbourne, Parramatta and Salford.

Early life
Born in Auckland, New Zealand with Niuean and Tongan heritage. Langi moved to Australia, educated at Trinity Catholic College, Auburn, where he represented  1999 Australian Schoolboys.

Playing career
Langi made his first grade debut for St George against Canterbury in Round 3 2000.  Langi then joined Melbourne and played with the club between 2001 and 2003 before joining Parramatta in 2004.

Langi became a regular starter for Parramatta and made 16 appearances for the club.  Langi signed for Salford in 2005. He retired from the sport in December 2006 due to an eye condition and returned home.

References

External links
http://www.salfordadvertiser.co.uk/sport/salfordreds/news/s/221/221186_fade_to_gray.html

1981 births
Living people
New Zealand rugby league players
New Zealand people of Niuean descent
New Zealand sportspeople of Tongan descent
St. George Illawarra Dragons players
Melbourne Storm players
Parramatta Eels players
Salford Red Devils players
Rugby league centres
Rugby league players from Auckland